Thornton is a name sometimes used for part of a suburb in western Hamilton in New Zealand.

Aldershot Place, Arundel Place, Dorchester Place, Farnborough Drive, Hadrians Way, Highbury Place, Sandhurst Place, Twickenham Place, Wembley Close and Wimbledon Close were named in 1997 by Thornton Estates Ltd., the developer, using English place names. They are more usually described as being in Nawton and are in the Nawton West census area.

References

See also
 Suburbs of Hamilton, New Zealand

Suburbs of Hamilton, New Zealand